Darakeh is a neighbourhood of Tehran.

Darakeh or Derkeh or Derkah may also refer to:
 Darakeh, Chaharmahal and Bakhtiari
 Derkeh, Kermanshah
 Darakeh, Gilan-e Gharb, Kermanshah Province
 Darakeh-ye Oros Khan, West Azerbaijan Province
 Darakeh-ye Lotfollah, West Azerbaijan Province
 Dargah, Iran (disambiguation)